Pointe-Noire is a commune on Guadeloupe, a French overseas department in the Caribbean. It is located on the northwest coast of the island of Basse-Terre.

Education
Public preschools include:
 Ecole maternelle Baille-Argent
 Ecole maternelle Bellevue Rosalie

Public primary schools include:
 Ecole primaire Baille-Argent
 Ecole primaire Timoleon Berbain
 Ecole primaire Renaud David
 Ecole primaire Bardochan Faustin
 Ecole primaire Guyonneau
 Ecole primaire Annerose Maurice

Public junior high schools include:
 Collège Courbaril

Public senior high schools include:
 LPO de Pointe-Noire (including the SEP)

See also
Communes of the Guadeloupe department

References

Communes of Guadeloupe